Highway 5, known more commonly as the Fort Smith Highway, completed in 1966, is a highway in Canada's Northwest Territories, which travels through Wood Buffalo National Park and connects Fort Smith to Hay River. At the Alberta border it connects to Alberta Highway 48 which runs  from Smith Landing, Fitzgerald. This highway connects to other area roads going to Hay Camp, and Peace Point, and form a circle route through Wood Buffalo National Park. Residents of Fort Chipewyan have petitioned the Alberta government for a  road to connect with the area roads out of Fort Smith.

Since 2017, the highway has been fully paved.

References

Northwest Territories territorial highways